Alô, Alô, Carnaval (Hello, Hello Carnival) is a 1936 Brazilian musical comedy  film directed and produced by Adhemar Gonzaga and Wallace Downey, and released by the Cinédia production company.

Hello, Hello, Carnival was the first Brazilian film to use playback in its musical  numbers. Limiting this process to only a few choice scenes, direct live audio can still be heard in the background.

The film premiered on January 20, 1936, at the Cinema Alhambra in Rio de Janeiro, and on  February 3, 1936, in São Paulo.

Originally called "O Grande Cassino", the film's inception came from the need to present singers from Brazil's golden age of radio to a larger mass audience. Set in a pre-television age, the plot focuses on a low-income population which had little, if any, access to entertainment at the nation's Casinos.

The film has been restored several times. In 1952, a print was given to the Cooperativa Cinematográfica Brasileira, where it was remounted, removing several scenes. Another restoration was made in 1974, reversing these deletions. In 1986, scenes with comedian Jorge Murad were found in the film library of the Museu de Arte Moderna do Rio de Janeiro. By the end of 2000, a serious quality restoration project began with substantial financial support. The team concluded its work in March 2002. The film was rereleased in São Paulo, in June 2002.

Cast 
 Jaime Costa as Empresário  
 Barbosa Júnior as Author 1  
 Pinto Filho as Author 2 
 Oscarito as man in the casino  
 Lelita Rosa as Morena
 Aurora Miranda 
 Carmen Miranda
 Henrique Chaves as Crupiê  
 Paulo de Oliveira Gonçalves as Barman  
 Jorge Murad as Contador de piadas
 Dircinha Batista
 Heloísa Helena
 Alzirinha Camargo
 Irmãs Pagãs 
 Francisco Alves
 Almirante
 Bando da Lua

References

External links
 

1936 musical comedy films
1936 films
Brazilian musical comedy films
Films directed by Adhemar Gonzaga
1930s Portuguese-language films
Brazilian black-and-white films
Cinédia films